The South African type EW tender was a steam locomotive tender.

Type EW tenders entered service in 1938, as tenders to the Class 23  Mountain type steam locomotives which entered service on the South African Railways in that year.

Manufacturers
Type EW tenders were built in 1938 by Berliner Maschinenbau and Henschel and Son.

The South African Railways (SAR) placed 136 Class 23 locomotives in service in 1938 and 1939. The locomotive and tender was designed by W.A.J. Day, Chief Mechanical Engineer of the South African Railways (SAR) from 1936 to 1939, as a general utility locomotive capable of operating on  rail.

Characteristics
The tender rode on six-wheeled bogies. The first batch of twenty locomotives were delivered with such tenders.

The second batch of 116 locomotives were delivered with tenders of which the underframe was modified. To improve the weight distribution, both bogie pivot centres were relocated  towards the rear.

Four vacuum cylinders operated clasp brakes on all tender wheels and a hand brake was included. Since experience showed that a firegrate of  cannot be served effectively under all conditions by manual stoking, particularly on long runs, a mechanical stoker was fitted. The mechanical stoker's engine was mounted on the tender.

Locomotives
Only Class 23 locomotives were delivered new with Type EW tenders, which were numbered in the ranges from 2552 to 2271 and 3201 to 3316 for their engines. An oval number plate, bearing the engine number and often also the locomotive class and tender type, was attached to the rear end of the tenders.

When the Class 23 were withdrawn, many of their Type EW tenders were coupled to Class 15F locomotives to increase their range.

Classification letters
Since many tender types are interchangeable between different locomotive classes and types, a tender classification system was adopted by the SAR. The first letter of the tender type indicates the classes of engines to which it can be coupled. The "E_" tenders were arranged with mechanical stokers and could be used with the locomotive classes as shown.
 Class 15F, if equipped with a mechanical stoker.
 Class 23.
 Class 25NC.
 Class 26.

The second letter indicates the tender's water capacity.

Modification
At least one of the tenders, no. 3209, was later rebuilt to a water-only tender.

Illustration

References

EW